In modal logic, a regular modal logic is a modal logic containing (as axiom or theorem) the duality of the modal operators:

and closed under the rule

Every normal modal logic is regular, and every regular modal logic is classical.

References 
Chellas, Brian. Modal Logic: An Introduction. Cambridge University Press, 1980.

Logic
Modal logic